15 Days may refer to:
 15 Days (video game)
 15 Days (TV series)